"He Oughta Know That by Now" is a song written by Clint Ingersoll and Jeremy Spillman, and recorded by American country music artist Lee Ann Womack.  It was released in April 2005 as the second single from her album There's More Where That Came From.  The song was a Top 30 hit on the U.S. Hot Country Songs chart.

Chart performance

References

2005 singles
2005 songs
Lee Ann Womack songs
Song recordings produced by Byron Gallimore
MCA Nashville Records singles
Songs written by Jeremy Spillman